Variety is the spice of life, is a common saying

The Spice of Life may refer to:

Music

Albums
Spice of Life (George Fox album)
Spice of Life, album by D'Sound
The Spice of Life (Kazumi Watanabe album)
The Spice of Life (Marlena Shaw album)
The Spice of Life (Earl Klugh album)

Songs
"Spice of Life", hit single by Manhattan Transfer from Bodies and Souls, 1983
"Spice of Life", by George Fox from Spice of Life
"The Spice of Life", by Everything but the Girl from Eden

Venues
The Spice of Life, London, pub at Cambridge Circus in Charing Cross Road